Ranjitsinh Mohite-Patil is an Indian politician from Bharatiya Janata Party and a Member of Legislative Council From Maharasthra.

Political career
He is a Member of the Parliament of India representing Maharashtra in the Rajya Sabha, the upper house of the Indian Parliament during 2009-2012. He was elected in by-election after the resignation of sitting member from Nationalist Congress Party Supriya Sule, being elected in May 2009 to 15th Lok Sabha.

He is son of Vijaysingh Mohite-Patil, former deputy chief minister of Maharashtra and is President of Indian Bodybuilding and Fitness Federation. He was the first president of the state unit of Nationalist Youth Congress, youth wing of Nationalist Congress Party. He was also the Chairman of Solapur District Central Co-operative Bank.

He is a Member of Maharashtra Legislative Council from 14 May 2020, Solapur-Local Authorities constituency.

He was BJP Candidate for Maharasthra MLC Elections held unopposed in May 2020.

Positions held 

 Member of parliament ( 2009 to 2012)
 Member of legislative council of Maharashtra (2020 to till date)

External links
 Profile on Rajya Sabha website

References

Living people
Nationalist Congress Party politicians from Maharashtra
Marathi politicians
Members of the Maharashtra Legislative Council
Rajya Sabha members from Maharashtra
People from Akluj
Bharatiya Janata Party politicians from Maharashtra
1972 births